The Kiungani Rear Range Lighthouse is located in Stone Town, Zanzibar, Tanzania. The lighthouse is located alongside Nyerere Road and provides support for ships trying to dock at the Stone Town harbor.

See also
List of lighthouses in Tanzania

References

External links 
 Tanzania Ports Authority

Lighthouses in Tanzania
Buildings and structures in Zanzibar